The 2014 Seattle Reign FC season is the club's second season of play and their second season in the National Women's Soccer League, the top division of women's soccer in the United States.

Review and events

Preseason 
Following an inaugural 2013 season that saw the team finish 7th out of 8 teams, the roster was significantly overhauled by Head Coach and GM Laura Harvey, with only 9 players returning for the 2014 season. In November, the team acquired US National team forward Sydney Leroux in a trade with the Boston Breakers.  Two days later, they
signed Scottish international Kim Little — who had previously played for Harvey at Arsenal — after acquiring her NWSL rights in a trade with the Washington Spirit.

In the January 2014 NWSL College Draft, the team selected Amanda Frisbie of Portland (1st round),  Megan Brigman of North Carolina (2nd round), and Ellen Parker of Portland (4th round).  In February, they announced that they would be moving home stadiums from Starfire Sports in Tukwila to Memorial Stadium, located near downtown Seattle in Seattle Center.  On February 10 they announced the signing of their third international player, adding Japanese national team midfielder Nahomi Kawasumi on loan from Japanese club side INAC Kobe Leonessa.

Regular season
During the 2014 season, the Reign set a league record unbeaten streak of 16 games. During the 16 game stretch, the Reign compiled a 13-0-3 record. The streak came to an end July 12, 2014 in a match against the Chicago Red Stars that ended 1-0 in favor of the Red Stars. The team finished first in the regular season clinching the NWSL Shield for the first time. Following the regular season, the team earned several league awards. Kim Little won the Golden Boot and Most Valuable Player awards; Laura Harvey was named Coach of the Year; Kendall Fletcher, Jess Fishlock, Little and Nahomi Kawasumi were named to the NWSL Best XI team while goalkeeper Hope Solo and defenders Lauren Barnes and Stephanie Cox were named to the Second XI team.

Playoffs
After defeating the Washington Spirit 2-1 in the playoff semi-finals, the Reign were defeated 2-1 by FC Kansas City during the championship final.

Club

Coaching staff

Roster

Competitions

Preseason

Regular season

Regular-season standings

Results summary

Results by matchday

Playoffs

Statistics

Goals and assists

Numbers in parentheses denote appearances as substitute.

Disciplinary record

Awards

2014 FIFA Ballon d'Or
 FIFA Women's World Player of the Year: Nahomi Kawasumi (nominee)
 FIFA World Coach of the Year for Women's Football: Laura Harvey (nominee)

Season Awards
 NWSL Golden Boot - Kim Little (16 goals)
 NWSL Coach of the Year - Laura Harvey
 NWSL Most Valuable Player - Kim Little
 NWSL Best XI - Kendall Fletcher, Jess Fishlock, Kim Little, Nahomi Kawasumi
 NWSL Second XI - Hope Solo, Lauren Barnes, Stephanie Cox

NWSL Player of the Month

 Kim Little, April, 2014.
 Kim Little, May, 2014.
 Kim Little, July, 2014.

NWSL Player of the Week
 Sydney Leroux, Week 4 
 Nahomi Kawasumi, Week 13, 16

Player of the Match 
 (Team awards for select matches)

 Kim Little vs. Boston Breakers, April 13, 2014. 
 Jess Fishlock vs. Washington Spirit, April 23, 2014.
 Kim Little vs. Houston Dash, April 27, 2014.
 Kim Little and Hope Solo at Portland Thorns FC, May 10, 2014.
 Keelin Winters vs. FC Kansas City, May 14, 2014.
 Sydney Leroux vs. Chicago Red Stars, June 7, 2014.
 Nahomi Kawasumi vs. Boston Breakers, July 6, 2014.
 Beverly Goebel vs Chicago Red Stars, July 20, 2014.
 Nahomi Kawasumi vs. Portland Thorns FC, July 27, 2014.
 Hope Solo vs. Washington Spirit, August 24, 2014 (Playoff semifinal)

Transfers

In

Out

Squad statistics
Note: only regular season squad statistics displayed

Key to positions: FW - Forward, MF - Midfielder, DF - Defender, GK - Goalkeeper

See also

2014 National Women's Soccer League season

References

External links

 

OL Reign seasons
Seattle Reign
Seattle Reign
Seattle Reign
Seattle Reign